Trigonorhinus limbatus is a species of fungus weevil in the beetle family Anthribidae. It is found in Central America and North America.

Subspecies
These two subspecies belong to the species Trigonorhinus limbatus:
 Trigonorhinus limbatus limbatus
 Trigonorhinus limbatus vestitus

References

Further reading

 
 

Anthribidae
Articles created by Qbugbot
Beetles described in 1827